Used coffee grounds is the result of brewing coffee, and are the final product after preparation of coffee. Despite having several highly-desirable chemical components, used coffee grounds are generally regarded as waste, and they are usually thrown away or composted. As of 2019, it was estimated that over 15 million tonnes of spent coffee grounds are generated annually.  Due to this quantity of waste and the chemical properties of used coffee grounds, potential uses for used coffee grounds are a hot topic of investigation as of the 2010s.  

In the late 19th century, used coffee grounds were used to adulterate pure coffee.

Chemical composition

Used coffee grounds are rich in sugars, which comprise about half of their weight.  A further 20% is made up of proteins, and a further 20% is lignins.
The dry coffee grounds contain significant amounts of potassium (11.7 g/kg), nitrogen (2.8 g/kg), magnesium (1.9 g/kg), and phosphorus (1.8 g/kg).  The quantity of caffeine remaining in used coffee grounds is around 48% of that in fresh coffee grounds.  There are significantly less tannins in used coffee grounds than fresh coffee grounds.

Production
On average, 1 tonne of green coffee produces approximately 650 kg of spent coffee grounds, and over 15 million tonnes of spent coffee grounds are generated annually.  In keeping with a life cycle approach to sustainability, this large quantity of waste requires waste management plans. Due to the amount of spent coffee grounds generated and the chemical properties of spent coffee grounds, the usage of spent coffee grounds is avidly investigated.

Usage

In gardens

In gardens, coffee grounds may be used for composting or as a mulch as they are known to slowly release nitrogen into the soil. They are said to be especially appreciated by worms and acid-loving plants such as blueberries, although due to acids being leached from the grounds while in use, they typically have a neutral pH, and red wiggler growth and survival has been experimentally tested and found to be reduced in treatments using used coffee grounds as the primary feedstock for the worms. Used coffee grounds are particularly noted as a soil amendment. Spent coffee grounds have phytotoxic properties which can be reduced through composting.  Gardeners have reported the use of used coffee grounds as a borer, slug and snail repellent, but this has not yet been scientifically tested. Some commercial coffee shops run initiatives to prevent the grounds from going to waste, including Starbucks' "Grounds for your Garden" project, and community sponsored initiatives exist, such as "Ground to Ground"  or the 'Green Coffee Shop Scheme' in Cambridgeshire, UK.

Use in fortune telling 

In divination and fortune-telling the patterns of coffee grounds are used for predictions.

Other uses

Initiatives have succeeded using coffee grounds as a substrate for the cultivation of mushrooms (including oyster mushrooms).  The use of spent coffee grounds in this application has the advantage of the used coffee grounds needing no pre-treatment to be usable as a mushroom substrate. Used coffee grounds have other homemade uses in wood staining, air fresheners, and body soap scrubs. They may also be used industrially in biogas production or to treat wastewater. Bioethanol may also be produced from the sugar content of spent coffee grounds, after it is defatted as a pre-treatment, it is typically hydrolysed by dilute acid.  In 2021, Gloucestershire-based football club Forest Green Rovers trialled a kit made from 35% used coffee grounds combined with recycled plastic.

It is not recommended to burn dried used coffee grounds, as they give off hazardous nitrogen oxides when burnt.

It has been proposed to use spent coffee grounds to feed ruminants, pigs, chickens and rabbits, but the high lignin content makes this an undesirable use.

Dried used coffee grounds were recommended to fill pincushions.

It has been suggested to recover caffeine from used coffee grounds for commercial applications in agrifood, cosmetic, nutraceutic or pharmaceutic industries.

Application of 10 kg used coffee grounds per square metre has been suggested as part of a crop rotation system, where for the first six months, the field is allowed to lie fallow with a layer of coffee grounds on it suppressing weed growth, then the coffee grounds are plowed in and legumes are grown, which fix their own nitrogen.  Application of an equal amount of horse manure at the same time as the coffee grounds has been shown to nearly eliminate negative effects of fresh used coffee grounds.

See also 
 Ecological effects of coffee
 Sustainable coffee

References 

Coffee derivatives
Horticulture
Composting
Food waste